The End Begins is the third studio album by American rock band Tantric. It is the first one recorded without the band's original members Todd Whitener, Matt Taul, and Jesse Vest. Vocalist Hugo Ferreira, the only remaining original member, was forced to scrap the original line-up's complete third album in favor of The End Begins, an effort established by new members of the band in addition to Ferreira. This is the only studio album to feature former Fuel drummer Kevin Miller.

Background

Left without a band, Hugo Ferreira scrapped the entire record. He began writing new material at his own studio before enlisting members of his side project, State of the Art, to record and tour as Tantric. These include ex-Fuel drummer Kevin Miller, ex-DramaGods bassist Joe Pessia on guitar, Fosterchild bassist Erik Leonhardt, and Marcus Ratzenboeck on electric violin, adding another dimension to the band. Ratzenboeck's brother Derek, a classical concert violinist, would composed the intro violin riff to the song "Down & Out".

With returning producer Toby Wright, the new line-up finished recording within 30 days in September 2007.

The End Begins was released on April 22, 2008, and debuted at number 91 on the Billboard 200. As of July 11, 2008, it has sold over 10,000 copies, with the lead single, "Down & Out" at number 8 on the Billboard Mainstream Rock Chart. The song's popularity led it to become Tampa Bay Rays slugger Evan Longoria's walk-up theme.

In regards to the album title, Hugo Ferreira cited the process up to its inception and stated, "the end of one thing led to the beginning of another." He also noted that the majority of songs revolve around either the band itself or a troubled personal relationship he endured during the writing process. Ferreira described the album's lyrical themes in a November 2008 interview:
"This record is all about the strife and challenges of getting back on my feet after the second Tantric record, After We Go, not only on a professional sense but a personal one as well. It deals with personal and emotional growth, and learning from the blows the industry and life gives you."
The only version of the physical End Begins album is a partially censored edition; the tracks "The One" and "Monopoly" are muted of explicit lyrics and listed as "Clean" when played on a PC. "Love Song", however, frequently uses the word "shit" uncensored during its chorus. It appears that the only way of obtaining the two aforementioned songs uncensored is by purchasing them as MP3s via iTunes or Amazon.com or obtaining them through the band's manager.

On January 13, 2009, The End Begins was re-released as a "Digital Deluxe" edition. This includes the bonus tracks "Down & Out" (Acoustic) and "Fall Down." As of May 2009, the album has sold well over 70,000 copies.

Based on crowd response to the song "Fall Down", which was originally planned for Tantric III, the band rerecorded it without the Nappy Roots feature as their second single for a November 4, 2008 radio and iTunes release. The version of the song featuring Nappy Roots can only be found on YouTube because lead singer Hugo Ferreira leaked the song out to fans for appreciation. With this, they also announced a re-release of The End Begins including the said song as a bonus track. The "Digital Deluxe" edition, available January 13, 2009, also features an acoustic version of "Down & Out" but is evidently only available in download form.

Track listing
All lyrics written by Hugo Ferreira.

Personnel
 Hugo Ferreira – vocals
 Kevin Miller – drums
 Joe Pessia – guitar
 Erik Leonhardt – bass
 Marcus Ratzenboeck – electric violin
 Kevin Martin – vocals on "The One"
 Toby Wright – producer and mixing
 James Musshorn – mix assistant
 Carlos Ferreira/Sketchtank – graphic design and packaging photography

References

2008 albums
Albums produced by Toby Wright
Tantric (band) albums